Tupare can refer to:

Olearia colensoi, a New Zealand-endemic shrub
Tupare (homestead), a mansion and associated gardens in New Plymouth, New Zealand